Armistice Day, later known as Remembrance Day in the Commonwealth and Veterans Day in the United States, is commemorated every year on 11 November to mark the armistice signed between the Allies of World War I and Germany at Compiègne, France, at 5:45 am for the cessation of hostilities on the Western Front of World War I, which took effect at eleven in the morning—the "eleventh hour of the eleventh day of the eleventh month" of 1918. But, according to Thomas R. Gowenlock, an intelligence officer with the U.S. First Division, shelling from both sides continued for the rest of the day, ending only at nightfall. The armistice initially expired after a period of 36 days and had to be extended several times. A formal peace agreement was reached only when the Treaty of Versailles was signed the following year.

The date is a national holiday in France, and was declared a national holiday in many Allied nations. However, many Western countries and associated nations have since changed the name of the holiday from Armistice Day, with member states of the Commonwealth of Nations adopting Remembrance Day, and the United States government opting for Veterans Day. In some countries Armistice Day coincides with other public holidays.

History in Allied countries 
The first Armistice Day celebration was held at Buckingham Palace, commencing with King George V hosting a "Banquet in Honour of the President of the French Republic" during the evening hours of 10 November 1919. The first official Armistice Day events were subsequently held in the grounds of Buckingham Palace on the morning of 11 November 1919, which included a two-minute silence as a mark of respect for those who died in the war and those left behind.

Similar ceremonies developed in other countries during the inter-war period.
In South Africa, for example, the Memorable Order of Tin Hats had by the late 1920s developed a ceremony whereby the toast of "Fallen Comrades" was observed not only in silence but darkness, all except for the "Light of Remembrance", with the ceremony ending with the Order's anthem "Old Soldiers Never Die".

In Britain, beginning in 1939, the two-minute silence was moved to the Sunday nearest to 11 November in order not to interfere with wartime production should 11 November fall on a weekday. This became Remembrance Sunday.

Commemorations of November 11 were initially focused on honoring the military dead of the First World War and the return to peace. Just prior to or after World War II, many countries changed the name of the holiday, several changed the focus to include all veterans of their armed services, and a few honor their war dead both uniformed and civilian. Most member states of the Commonwealth of Nations followed the earlier example of Canada and adopted the name Remembrance Day. The United States in 1954 changed the name to All Veterans Day, later shortened to 'Veterans Day',

21st century 

In the United Kingdom and Commonwealth countries, both Remembrance Day and Remembrance Sunday are commemorated formally, but are not public holidays. The National Service of Remembrance is held in London on Remembrance Sunday.

In the United States, Veterans Day honors American veterans, both living and deceased. The official day of national remembrance of those killed in action is Memorial Day, which predates World War I. Some, including American novelist Kurt Vonnegut and American Veteran For Peace Rory Fanning, have urged Americans to resume observation of 11 November as Armistice Day, a day to reflect on how we can achieve peace as it was originally observed.

In France, the holiday is known as Remembrance Day (Jour du Souvenir). In Belgium, it remains Armistice Day (Jour de l'Armistice).

The day has been a statutory holiday in Serbia since 2012. The Serbian forces suffered the largest casualty rate in World War I. To commemorate their victims, people in Serbia wear Natalie's ramonda as a symbol of remembrance.

In Poland, 11 November is observed as National Independence Day, a public holiday to commemorate the anniversary of the restoration of Poland's sovereignty as the Second Polish Republic in 1918, after 123 years of partition by the Russian Empire, the Kingdom of Prussia and the Habsburg Empire.

Ceremonies are held in Kenya over the weekend two weeks after Armistice Day. This is because news of the armistice only reached today's Zambia about a fortnight later, where the German and British commanders then had to agree on the protocols for their own armistice ceremony.

On 11 November 2018, the centenary of the Armistice, commemorations were held globally. In France, more than 60 heads of state and government gathered at the Arc de Triomphe in Paris.

See also 
 Timeline of World War I

Footnotes

References

External links 

 Dalisson, Rémi: Remembrance day: 11 November 1922–Today (France) in: International Encyclopedia of the First World War.
 Bedworth Armistice Day https://bedwortharmisticeday.org/ The largest and most famous Armistice Day Parade in Britain.

 
Aftermath of World War I
November observances
Observances honoring victims of war
Public holidays in Serbia
Recurring events established in 1919